Jaime Vargas may refer to:

 Jaime Vargas (ballet dancer), Canadian ballet dancer
 Jaime Vargas (indigenous leader) (born 1979), Ecuadorian indigenous leader